Astrocytic phosphoprotein PEA-15 is a protein that in humans is encoded by the PEA15 gene.

PEA15 is a death effector domain (DED)-containing protein predominantly expressed in the central nervous system, particularly in astrocytes.

PEA-15 promotes autophagy in glioma cells in a JNK-dependent manner.

Interactions 

PEA15 has been shown to interact with:
 Caspase 8, 
 FADD, and 
 MAPK1, 
 Phospholipase D1,  and
 RPS6KA3.

References

Further reading